Childress County is a county located in the U.S. state of Texas. As of the 2020 census, its population was 6,664. The county seat is Childress. The county was created in 1876 and later organized in 1887. It is named for George Campbell Childress, the author of the Texas Declaration of Independence.

County and regional history is preserved in the Childress County Heritage Museum in downtown Childress. The Bradley 3 Ranch, operated by matriarch Minnie Lou Bradley, is entirely in Childress County, but has a Memphis (Hall County) mailing address.

Geography

Major highways
  U.S. Highway 62
  U.S. Highway 83
  U.S. Highway 287
  State Highway 256

Adjacent counties
 Collingsworth County (north)
 Harmon County, Oklahoma (northeast)
 Hardeman County (east)
 Cottle County (south)
 Hall County (west)

Demographics

Note: the US Census treats Hispanic/Latino as an ethnic category. This table excludes Latinos from the racial categories and assigns them to a separate category. Hispanics/Latinos can be of any race.

As of the census of 2000, 7,688 people, 2,474 households, and 1,650 families resided in the county.  The population density was 11 people per square mile (4/km2).  The 3,059 housing units averaged 4 per square mile (2/km2).  The racial makeup of the county was 67.70% White, 14.09% Black or African American, 0.33% Native American, 0.30% Asian, 0.05% Pacific Islander, 15.70% from other races, and 1.83% from two or more races.  About 20.47% of the population was Hispanic or Latino of any race.

Of the 2,474 households, 31.30% had children under the age of 18 living with them, 52.40% were married couples living together, 11.40% had a female householder with no husband present, and 33.30% were not families. About 30.80% of all households were made up of individuals, and 16.50% had someone living alone who was 65 years of age or older.  The average household size was 2.40 and the average family size was 3.00.

In the county, the population was distributed as 22.10% under the age of 18, 12.10% from 18 to 24, 30.60% from 25 to 44, 19.40% from 45 to 64, and 15.80% who were 65 years of age or older.  The median age was 37 years. For every 100 females, there were 142.40 males.  For every 100 females age 18 and over, there were 149.50 males.

The median income for a household in the county was $27,457, and for a family was $35,543. Males had a median income of $25,606 versus $20,037 for females. The per capita income for the county was $12,452.  About 13.70% of families and 17.60% of the population were below the poverty line, including 28.30% of those under age 18 and 10.30% of those age 65 or over.

Communities

City
 Childress (county seat)

Unincorporated communities
 Carey
 Tell
 Kirkland

Politics
Republican Drew Springer, Jr., a businessman from Muenster in Cooke County, has since January 2013 represented Childress County in the Texas House of Representatives.

See also

 List of museums in the Texas Panhandle
 National Register of Historic Places listings in Childress County, Texas
 Recorded Texas Historic Landmarks in Childress County

References

External links
 Childress County government's website
 Historic photographs from the Childress County Heritage Museum, hosted by the Portal to Texas History
 Childress County in Handbook of Texas Online at the University of Texas
 Childress County Profile from the Texas Association of Counties

 
1887 establishments in Texas
Populated places established in 1887
Texas Panhandle